Elymus magellanicus, the Magellan wheatgrass, is a clump-forming grass native to South America. It grows 1½-ft high and wide and has metallic blue leaves. Nearly evergreen in mild climates, it is a good container plant.

Gallery

References

magellanicus